Ram Chandra Sahis is an Indian politician and member of the All Jharkhand Students Union. Sahis is a member of the Jharkhand Legislative Assembly from the Jugsalai constituency in East Singhbhum district.

References 

People from East Singhbhum district
All Jharkhand Students Union politicians
Members of the Jharkhand Legislative Assembly
Living people
21st-century Indian politicians
Year of birth missing (living people)